Dinosaurs Alive! was an animatronic dinosaur themed area which formerly operated at several amusement parks, but has since been closed. Woodbine Fantasy Fair was the first park to open the attraction in 2007. The version of this attraction at Kings Island was the world's largest animatronic dinosaur park. A $5–6.00 fee was charged to enter the attraction. At Carowinds, admission was free with a Gold or Platinum Pass. Each park also featured Dinostore, a gift shop filled with dinosaur toys and souvenirs. On October 27, 2019, the two remaining Dinosaurs Alive! exhibits closed permanently.

The exhibits were created by Dinosaurs Unearthed. Some markets, like Toronto, previously staged their touring exhibit at other venues. Some reviewers noted that seeing a roller coaster in the background was an "incongruity". A sand pit allowed children to "dig" for dinosaurs at an area near the end of the attraction.

Dinosaurs
The exhibits featured dinosaurs that were built to scale and depicted various habitats they would have likely encountered. Each amusement park configuration was unique, with some featuring exhibits not present at the others:

In addition to being life-sized, many of the dinosaurs were animatronic. Models featured moving skin, with no visible joints or seams. Some were interactive, that allowed visitors to press buttons on the exhibit's sign to control the movement of various body parts depending on where the button was located (e.g., button on snout opens jaws, button on throat thrashes neck and button on rear makes the tail sway). The non-interactive animatronic dinosaurs were activated when motion sensors detect movement by guests walking by. Sound effects from hidden speakers also accompanied the various movements including roaring, bellowing and/or shrieking.

Size

Movie
A dinosaur-related 3D movie was shown at Carowinds in their respective Action Theater with the motion seats removed. It was also shown at King Dominion and Canada's Wonderland as well. The film was included with park admission at most parks, while admission to both the attraction and film costed $6 at Canada's Wonderland. At Wonderland, the film shown in the theater is the 11-minute Monsters of the Deep, while Dinosaurs: Monsters of Patagonia was shown at Carowinds and Kings Island.

Kings Island, Cedar Point and Carowinds charged an additional $5 admission per person over the age of 2. However, Carowinds did offer special Dinosaurs Alive! endorsement stickers that could be attached to season passes for $15, granting the passholder unlimited trips through the exhibit for that season.

Reception
The added admission fee was the target of criticism. Cedar Point representatives have stated that the fee is to avoid overcrowding in the section. A writer for Wired.com suggested that, given the cost of admission, parking and food at Canada's Wonderland, the added cost of Dinosaurs Alive! was trivial. Some theme park enthusiasts suggested in advance of opening that the attraction would not be "repeatable", in advance of its Cedar Point opening.

Many dinosaurs in the Canada's Wonderland attraction were juveniles, causing one reviewer to speculate this was "a cost-saving measure." The reviewer also noted that in some instances, the info panels didn't match the depiction in the exhibit. For example, the Canada's Wonderland Eotyrannus lacked feathers despite the nearby illustration suggesting otherwise.

See also
 2011 in amusement parks
 2012 in amusement parks
 2013 in amusement parks
 Dinosaur Island (Sea World)
 Dinosaurs Alive!, an IMAX film

References

External links
 Dinosaurs Alive! at Canada's Wonderland
 Dinosaurs Alive! at Carowinds
 Dinosaurs Alive! at Cedar Point 
 Dinosaurs Alive! at Dorney Park
 Dinosaurs Alive! at Kings Dominion
 Dinosaurs Alive! at Kings Island
 Dinosaurs Alive! at Valleyfair
 Dinosaurs Alive! at Worlds of Fun

Amusement rides introduced in 2011
Amusement rides introduced in 2012
Amusement rides introduced in 2013
Cedar Fair attractions
Canada's Wonderland
Carowinds
Cedar Point
Dorney Park & Wildwater Kingdom
Kings Dominion
Kings Island
Valleyfair
Worlds of Fun
Animatronic attractions
Dinosaurs in amusement parks
Amusement rides manufactured by Dinosaurs Unearthed